The Bex Eagle is a bronze sculpture located in Pershing Park, Washington, D.C.

It was dedicated on May 3, 1982.

See also
 King at Rest
 List of public art in Washington, D.C., Ward 6

References

External links

1980s establishments in Washington, D.C.
1982 sculptures
Animal sculptures in Washington, D.C.
Sculptures of birds in the United States
Bronze sculptures in Washington, D.C.
Granite sculptures in Washington, D.C.
Outdoor sculptures in Washington, D.C.
Statues in Washington, D.C.
Federal Triangle